Yoqub Ahmedov (born 3 January 1938) is an Uzbek theater and film actor. He was named People's Artist of the USSR in 1991 and People's artist of Uzbekistan.

Early life
He was born in Namangan on 3 January 1938 and took a degree at Tashkent Institute of Arts 1959.

Family
His daughter Nadira Abdullayeva is an actress, his grandchildren are Tojirahmon Abdullayev, Aslzoda & Mohizoda. His son-in-law Rixsitulla Abdullayev was born on 5 April 1978 in Tashkent is also an Uzbek film and theater actor.

 Nodira Abdullayeva (Ahmedova) Yoqubovna
 Sitora Ahmedova Yoqubovna
 Furqat Ahmedov Yoqubovich
 Rihsitilla Abdullaev
 Tojirahmon Abdullayev
 Aslzoda
 Mohizoda
 Klara Jalilova Alimadatovna

Filmography
 1958 Maftuningman  
 1977 Mischievous children  
 1989 Coins  
 1991 Au! Ograblenie train   
 1997 The Days  
 2003 Destiny  
 2004 The wave of Hearts as Yuldashev 
 2009 Revenge  
 2010 Threatened  
 2014 Come and see  
 2014 Owner  
 2015 The Baron 
 2016 Baron 2
 2015-2018 Hotel

References

External links
 

1938 births
Living people
People from Namangan Region
People's Artists of the USSR
Uzbekistani male stage actors
Uzbekistani male film actors
Soviet male film actors